The 1834 Rhode Island gubernatorial election was held on April 16, 1834.

Incumbent Democratic Governor John Brown Francis won re-election to a second term, defeating Whig nominee Nehemiah R. Knight.

General election

Candidates
John Brown Francis, Democratic, incumbent Governor
Nehemiah R. Knight, Whig, incumbent U.S. Senator, former Governor

Results

References

1834
Rhode Island
Gubernatorial